Gloria López (born 19 November 1965) is a Colombian sports shooter. She competed in the women's 10 metre air rifle event at the 1984 Summer Olympics.

References

1965 births
Living people
Colombian female sport shooters
Olympic shooters of Colombia
Shooters at the 1984 Summer Olympics
Place of birth missing (living people)
20th-century Colombian women